Holy Family with the Infant Saint John the Baptist is an oil on canvas painting by Domenico Beccafumi, executed c. 1521–1522, now in the Alte Pinakothek in Munich, which it entered in 1850. It was previously acquired from the casa Marsili in Siena in 1816 for 975 scudi for Prince Ludwig.

Baccheschi dated the work to the years the artist was working for the Marsili by comparison with the San Martino Nativity. Dami agreed, though Adolfo Venturi attributed it to Bacchiacca, possibly confused by a poor photographic reproduction. The attribution to Beccafumi is now universally accepted. Its circular format and balanced composition shows the influence of the late 15th century and early 16th century Florentine school, particularly Raphael.

References

1522 paintings
Paintings by Domenico Beccafumi
Paintings of the Holy Family
Paintings depicting John the Baptist
Collection of the Alte Pinakothek